Harvey Eugene Oyer III (born April 5, 1968) is an American author and attorney from West Palm Beach, Florida. Best known for his award-winning children's book series "The Adventures of Charlie Pierce", he was named Florida Distinguished Author in 2013

Early life and education
Oyer was born in Boynton Beach, Florida, the son of Harvey Eugene Oyer Jr., a former Boynton Beach Mayor, and Linda Eve Oyer.  A fifth generation Floridian, Oyer is the great-great grandson of pioneer settler Captain Hannibal Dillingham Pierce, who was one of the first non-Native Americans to settle in Southeast Florida, arriving in 1872. Pierce was one of several early settlers who planted thousands of coconuts salvaged from a Spanish shipwreck in 1878.  The resulting acres of coconut palms eventually provided Palm Beach, West Palm Beach, and Palm Beach County with their respective names.  Oyer is the great grandson of Lillie Pierce Voss, the first white child born between Jupiter and Miami, an area that now has approximately 6 million people. She was inducted into the Florida Women's Hall of Fame in 2013. He is the great grand nephew of Charles William Pierce, for whom Oyer's children's book series is named. Pierce was elected a Great Floridian in 2009.

Oyer attended the University of Florida where he graduated with a Bachelor of Arts degree in Economics with high honors and with election to Phi Beta Kappa. He won a Rotary Ambassadorial Scholarship and studied graduate economics at the Australian National University in Canberra, Australia.  Oyer graduated with a Master of Philosophy in Archaeology from the University of Cambridge in England and with a Juris Doctor, with honors, from the University of Florida College of Law.  He was admitted to the Florida Bar in 1998.  He served in the United States Marine Corps, attaining the rank of captain.

Career

Writing
Oyer has written or contributed to a number of books and articles, predominantly about Florida and Florida's history.  He is best known as the author of The Adventures of Charlie Pierce children's book series, which is widely used in Florida schools.  The first book in the series, “The American Jungle”, was published in 2008.  The second book in the series, “The Last Egret”, was published in 2010.  The third book in the series, “The Last Calusa”, was published in 2012.  The fourth book in the series, "The Barefoot Mailman", was published in 2015.  The fifth book in the series, "Charlie and the Tycoon", was published in 2016.  His books have won numerous awards and have sold over 100,000 copies in Florida.

In 2013, Oyer was named Florida Distinguished Author by Florida House in Washington D.C.

Public speaker
Oyer is a speaker, lecturer, and storyteller who regularly presents lectures on the history and environment of Florida. He was an adjunct professor of law at the University of Miami School of Law and an adjunct professor of political science at the Florida Atlantic University Honors College.  He has been a guest lecturer at a number of schools and universities, including Palm Beach Atlantic University and Vanderbilt University Law School.

Historic preservation
Oyer has been involved in a number of historic preservation efforts. In the early to mid-2000s, he led the effort to save and restore the historic 1916 Palm Beach County Courthouse which was under the threat of demolition. He later led the effort to create the Richard and Pat Johnson Palm Beach County History Museum in the restored building.  In the late 2000s, he helped lead the effort to restore iconic Worth Avenue in Palm Beach.

Board memberships
Oyer served for seven years as the Chairman of the Historical Society of Palm Beach County, as the 100th Chairman of the Chamber of Commerce of the Palm Beaches, and as a board member of the South Florida Science Center and Aquarium, Florida Historical Society, Palm Beach United Way, Palm Beach State College Foundation, and Palm Beach County Education Commission.

Publications
 The Adventures of Charlie Pierce: Charlie and the Tycoon, 2016
 The Adventures of Charlie Pierce: The Barefoot Mailman, 2015
 The Adventures of Charlie Pierce: The Last Calusa, 2012 
 The Adventures of Charlie Pierce:  The Last Egret, 2010 
 The Adventures of Charlie Pierce:  The American Jungle, 2008
 Wrote the Foreword, Pioneering Palm Beach:  The Deweys and the South Florida Frontier, by Ginger L. Pedersen and Janet M. Devries, 2012
 Wrote the Foreword, Lila Vanderbilt Webb's Miradero, A Window on an Era, by Robert Ganger, 2005 
 Wrote the Foreword, Black, Gold and Silver Sands, A Pictorial History of Agriculture in Palm Beach County, by James Snyder, 2004
 “The Wreck of the Providencia in 1878 and the Naming of Palm Beach County,” Vol. 29, South Florida History, Nov. 4, 2001
 “Barefoot Mailman, A Job that Became a Legend,” Vol. 28, South Florida History, Nov. 4, 2000

Honors and awards
Oyer has been awarded the Ellis Island Medal of Honor, the Thomas Jefferson Award for Public Service, National Society of Daughters of the American Revolution National Community Service Award and was named one of the “100 Most Influential Floridians” by Florida International magazine and a Legend of Palm Beach by Palm Beach Illustrated magazine.

References

1968 births
Alumni of the University of Cambridge
Australian National University alumni
Living people
People from Boynton Beach, Florida
Fredric G. Levin College of Law alumni
Writers from Florida